"iYiYi" is the debut single by Australian singer Cody Simpson featuring American rapper Flo Rida. It is the lead single from Simpson's 2010 debut extended play, 4 U. It was written by the artists alongside Colby O'Donis, Bei Maejor, and producer DJ Frank E. It was released digitally worldwide on 1 June 2010.

It was one of the songs featured in the interactive role-playing adventure video game The Sims 3.

Performances
Simpson performed "IYiYi" at the 2010 Australian Kids' Choice Awards as the closing act.

Chart performance
iYiYi has been listed for 19 weeks in 3 different charts. Its first appearance was week 24/2010 in the Australia Singles Top 50 and the last appearance was week 13/2011 in the Canada Singles Top 100. Its peak position was number 19, on the Australia Singles Top 50, it stayed there for 2 weeks. Its highest entry was number 25 in the Australia Singles Top 50.

Music video
The music video for "iYiYi" was released on 30 June 2010.
It was filmed in Simpson's hometown, the Gold Coast, Queensland in Australia.

Formats and track listings
Deluxe single
 "iYiYi" (featuring. Flo Rida)
 "iYiYi" (Acoustic Version)
 "Summertime"

Charts

Release history

References

2010 debut singles
Cody Simpson songs
Flo Rida songs
Song recordings produced by DJ Frank E
Songs written by Maejor
Songs written by Flo Rida
Songs written by DJ Frank E
2010 songs
Songs written by Cody Simpson